Johannes Lundson (12 October 1867 – 11 August 1939) was a Finnish politician of the Young Finnish Party and National Progressive Party. He was born in Leppävirta.
Lundson was the Speaker of the Parliament in 1917 and was chairing the session on 6 December 1917 when the declaration of independence was approved. Additionally, he served as Minister of Finance from August 1919 to March 1920. He died in Salo, aged 71.

References 

1867 births
1939 deaths
People from Leppävirta
People from Kuopio Province (Grand Duchy of Finland)
Young Finnish Party politicians
National Progressive Party (Finland) politicians
Ministers of Finance of Finland
Members of the Diet of Finland
Speakers of the Parliament of Finland
Members of the Parliament of Finland (1917–19)
People of the Finnish Civil War (White side)
University of Helsinki alumni